Pulse is an Australian television drama series that was first screened on ABC TV on 20 July 2017 and ended after eight episodes on 7 September 2017.

The series was written by Kris Wyld, Michael Miller, Kristen Dunphy and Mandy McCarthy; directed by Peter Andrikidis, Jennifer Leacey and Ana Kokkinos; and produced by ClandestineTV and Beyond Productions in conjunction with the Australian Broadcasting Corporation.

Plot summary
The series follows the story of Frankie, a high-flying financial analyst who had it all before a failing kidney landed her at death's door until a transplant offered her a second chance. Inspired by the man who saved her life, Frankie alters course to become a doctor herself, working and learning in the high stakes, high pressure world of the cardio-thoracic and renal wards of a major teaching hospital.

Cast
 Claire van der Boom as Frankie Bell
 Andrea Demetriades as Lou Tannis
 Owen Teale as Chad Berger
 Liam McIntyre as Eli Nader
 Pallavi Sharda as Tanya Kalchuri
 Penny Cook as Carol Little
 Susie Porter as Maggie Cutter
 Renee Lim as Monica Lee
 Arka Das as Tabb Patel
 Blessing Mokgohloa as Rowan Mitri
 Dalip Sondhi as Rupert Steele

Episodes

Reception

Ratings

Critical reception
This series has received mixed reviews.

Luke Buckmaster, writer for The Guardian, rated the series two out of five stars saying "medical dramas will probably never fall out of fashion. The genre is crowded, emphasising the need for programs with interesting and distinctive visions. Unfortunately, Pulse isn’t one of them".

David Knox, writer for TV Tonight, rated the series four out of five stars praising the casting of the series and that it's "the strongest medical drama in years" saying that it holds strong against an overcrowded genre.

References

External links
 

Australian drama television series
2017 Australian television series debuts
2017 Australian television series endings
English-language television shows
Australian Broadcasting Corporation original programming
Television series by Beyond Television Productions